The Malacañang of the South, also known as the Presidential Guest House in Davao or Panacañang, is a presidential guest house in Panacan, Davao City that serves as the Philippine President's official residence in Mindanao. It is located in the compound and office complex of the Department of Public Works and Highways (DPWH) Davao Region.

History
Conceived under the administration of President Gloria Macapagal Arroyo in 2005, when the Office of the President acquired the property inside the DPWH Compound in Davao City, the two-storey guesthouse was completed in 2007. It was planned to serve as an official residence of the subsequent presidents when visiting Davao and the surrounding provinces. However, it was used only once by Macapagal-Arroyo and was only used as a staging point by President Benigno Aquino III in his visits to the city and the nearby Samal Island and Santa Cruz, Davao del Sur.

President Rodrigo Duterte indicated that the guest house will have a more active role in his administration. It served as his active office and residence and an alternative to Malacañang Palace in Manila. It was in active use as a meeting place for his Cabinet.

Facilities
The Malacañang of the South houses 8 airconditioned rooms, serving as living quarters of the President, staff and VIPs, along with a conference room and a personal working office for the chief executive. Overlooking the sea, it has a view of the Island Garden City of Samal and includes a jetty port for transport to the island, also fitting the presidential yacht. It includes a helipad shared with the DPWH warehouse facilities.

The building also includes space for use by the state-owned television, PTV4 and Radio Television Malacañang (RTVM), the only media entities allowed in the facility.

See also
Malacañang Palace, the official residence and working office of the President of the Philippines
Malacañang sa Sugbo, the former residence of the President of the Philippines in the Visayas
Malacañang of the North, presidential museum and former official residence of the President of the Philippines in Ilocos Region
The Mansion (Baguio), the official summer residence of the President of the Philippines

References

Official residences in the Philippines
Buildings and structures in Davao City
Buildings and structures completed in 2007
21st-century architecture in the Philippines